John Fogerty is an American rock musician who has recorded both solo and as a member of Creedence Clearwater Revival.

Fogerty has released ten studio albums between his debut album The Blue Ridge Rangers in 1973, to his most recent release, Fogerty's Factory, in 2020. He has also released 26 singles, including the Billboard Hot 100 Top 10 single, "The Old Man Down the Road". The song was also a Number One single on the Billboard Hot Mainstream Rock Tracks chart, his only Number One on a Billboard singles chart.

The most successful studio release is 1985's Centerfield. The album peaked at No. 1 on the Billboard 200 and was certified 2× Multi-Platinum by the Recording Industry Association of America. The two follow up albums, Eye of the Zombie (1986) and Blue Moon Swamp (1997), were both certified Gold in the United States.

Albums

Studio albums

Live albums

Compilation and specialty albums

Singles

Promo-only singles

Other appearances

Studio appearances

Live appearances

Guest appearances

Videography

Video albums

Music videos

See also 

 Hoodoo

Notes

References

Country music discographies
Discographies of American artists
Rock music discographies
Discography